Zhong Ling (born October 30, 1983 in Guangxi, China) is one of China's most successful individual rhythmic gymnasts.

Career 
She started rhythmic gymnastics in 1991 and her first international event was in 1995. She trains at the Beijing Sports University. Zhong had her highest placement finishing 9th in All-around at the 2001 World Championships in Madrid, Spain. She competed at the 2004 Athens Olympics where she finished 15th in All-around.

An annual Zhong Ling Cup is held in China.

References

External links
 
 

1983 births
Living people
Chinese rhythmic gymnasts
Gymnasts at the 2004 Summer Olympics
Olympic gymnasts of China
Gymnasts from Guangxi
Asian Games medalists in gymnastics
Gymnasts at the 2002 Asian Games
Asian Games gold medalists for China
Medalists at the 2002 Asian Games
Universiade medalists in gymnastics
Universiade silver medalists for China
21st-century Chinese women